Mullach Glas (Irish for "grey/green summit") is one of the Maumturk Mountains of Connemara in County Galway, Ireland. At , it is the fifth-highest of the Maumturks, the 197th–highest peak in Ireland on the Arderin list, and 238th–highest on the Vandeleur-Lynam list.  Mullach Glas is on a massif that includes Binn Mhór and Corcogemore; this massif is at the far southeastern sector of the long north-west to south-east spine of the Maumturks.

Name
Irish academic Paul Tempan records that  translates as "grey/green summit", and that the peak has also been called "Shannagirah".

Geography
Mullach Glas lies on a small massif in the southeast sector of the Maumturks range, which is separated from the main range by a deep east–west mountain pass called Máméan, a site of pilgrimage dedicated to Saint Patrick since the 5th-century.

To the north east is the minor subsidiary peak of Mullach Glas NE Top, also known as Cruiscín (probably meaning "jug").  To the west is Binn Mhór, the 3rd-highest peak in the Maumturks range, while to the east is Corcogemore

Hill walking
The most straightforward route to the summit Mullach Glas is the 10-kilometre 4–5 hour roundtrip route from the pass at Máméan and back; however, because of its positioning on a high ridge of its own small massif, it can also be climbed as an alternative 10-kilometre 4–5 hour route from Corcogemore in the west, across Mullach Glas, to the summit of Binn Mhór, and then finishing down at Máméan (i.e. the route requires two cars).

Mullach Glas is also climbed as part of the Maamturks Challenge, a 25-kilometre 10–12 hour walk over the full Maumturks range (from Maam Cross to Leenaun), which is considered one of the "great classic ridge-walks of Ireland", but of "extreme grade" due to the circa 7,600 feet of total ascent.  Since 1975, the University College Galway Mountaineering Club has run the annual "Maamturks Challenge Walk" (MCW), and mans a checkpoint to the west of Mullach Glas in the Máméan pass, and to the east of Mullach Glas on the neighbouring peak of Corcogemore.

Gallery

Bibliography

See also

Twelve Bens, major range in Connemara
Mweelrea, major range in Killary Harbour
Lists of mountains in Ireland
Lists of mountains and hills in the British Isles
List of Hewitt mountains in England, Wales and Ireland

References

External links
The Maamturks Challenge, University College Galway Mountaineering Club
The Maamturks Challenge: Routecard (2015)
MountainViews: The Irish Mountain Website, Mullach Glas
MountainViews: Irish Online Mountain Database
The Database of British and Irish Hills , the largest database of British Isles mountains ("DoBIH")
Hill Bagging UK & Ireland, the searchable interface for the DoBIH

Hewitts of Ireland
Mountains and hills of County Galway
Mountains under 1000 metres